Queen Jeonghwa of the Sincheon Gang clan (personal name Gang Jin-ui, was the second daughter of Gang Bo-yuk who would become the great-grandmother of Wang Geon, founder of the Goryeo dynasty. As a figure from the Later Silla period, she is the first one from among the ancestors of King Taejo to be accurately reported by the left records.

Biography
Gang Chung was a son of Gang Ho-gyeong who was the 67th descendant of Gang Hou. Gang Hou was the second child of Gang Shu who was from Zingzhao country, Shangxi province in China. He had three children named as I-Jegeon, Bo-Seung and Gang Bo Yuk. Gang Bo Yuk married with his niece Gang Deju and their daughter Kang Jin-ui (강진의, 康辰義) was born. Kang Jin-ui married a Chinese man and birthed the future King Uijo of Goryeo. The father of King Uijo was from a royal family of the Tang dynasty, China. According to Pyeonnyeon-Tong-Long (:ko:편년통록) and Goryeosa jeolyo (:ko:고려사절요), he was Emperor Suzong of Tang. In Pyeonnyeongangmog, it stated that Emperor Xuānzong of Tang was the father of King Uijo. When his father visited Silla, King Uijo of Goryeo was born between his Chinese father and Kang Jin-ui who was a daughter of Gang Bo-yuk. On the way of finding his father to China, King Uijo met Queen Wonchang and married her. According to Record of Seongwon, Queen Wonchang was a daughter of Tou En Dian Jiao Gan from Ping state (:zh:平州刺史部), China. Queen Wonchang gave birth to 4 boys; one of them whose name was Wang Ryung. His son eventually became the founder of Goryeo, Taejo of Goryeo.

According to Goryeosa, her elder sister climbed the top of Mount Ogwan in the dream. In the dream, she urinated as the world overflows and she talked about this dream to Jin-ui. Jin-ui thought this dream implied good luck and she bought her sister's dream with her silk woven Chima jeogori. After that she met the royal family from Tang dynasty in Silla and gave birth to King Uijo of Goryeo.

Family
Father: Gang Bo-yuk (강보육, 康寶育)
Grandfather: Gang Chung (강충, 康忠); son of Gang Ho-gyeong (강호경, 康虎景), founder of the Sincheon Gang clan.
Grandmother: Lady Gu of the Buja Gu clan (부자 구씨)
Uncle: Yi Je-geon (이제건, 伊帝建)
Uncle: Gang Bo-jeon (강보전, 康寶甸)
Mother: Lady Gang Deok-ju (강덕주, 康德州); niece of her husband.
Grandfather: Yi Je-geon (이제건, 伊帝建)
Older sister: Lady Gang (강씨, 康氏)
Husband: Gukjo, King Wondeok the Great (국조 원덕대왕)
Son: Jak Jae-geon, King Uijo of Goryeo (고려 의조)
Daughter-in-law: Yong-nyeo (용녀, 龍女) / Jeo Min-ui (저민의, 渚旻義/焉旻義), Queen Wonchang (원창왕후)

References

Sources

Royal consorts of the Goryeo Dynasty
Silla people
8th-century Korean women